Dawal Malikwadi is a village in Maharashtra, India. It is located in Umarga Taluka in Osmanabad district. The village resides in the Marathwada region, and falls under the supervision of the Aurangabad division. Located 62 km towards east from the district headquarters Osmanabad, the village is also 18 km from Umarga and 467 km from the state capital Mumbai.

Demographics 
The main language spoken here is Marathi.

Nearby villages 

 Supatgaon is 3 km away
 Dalimb is 4 km away
 Yenegur is 4 km away
 Bhosga is 7 km away
 Jewali is 7 km away

Dawal Malikwadi is surrounded by Omerga taluka towards east, Ausa taluka towards north, Åland taluka towards south, Tuljapur taluka towards west.

Nearby cities 
The cities near to Dawal Malikwadi are Umarga, Tuljapur, Nilanga, Osmanabad.

Postal details 
The postal head office of Dawal Malikwadi is Dalimb. The pin code of Dawal Malikwadi is - 413604.

Politics 
The National Congress Party (NCP), Shiv Sena, SHS and INC are the major political parties in Dawal Malikwadi.

Polling stations near Dawal Malikwadi 

 Z.P.P.S Dastapur east side
 Z.P.P.S Koral east side
 Z.P.P.S Kondajigad central side
 Z.P.P.S Sundarwadi west side
 Z.P.P.S Supatgaon central side

Education 
The colleges near Dawal Malikwadi are:

 Shri Sharadchandraji Pawar Junior college Naichakur
 National Backward Agriculture Education Information Technology Osmanabad
 Sevagram college
 Sevagram college, Kawatha

The schools in Dawal Malikwadi are:

 Adarsh Highschool
 Dr. Zakir Hussain Urdu High School
 Pratibha Niketan Vidyalaya
 Chhatrapati Shivaji Maharaj Vidyalaya

References 

Villages in Osmanabad district